Thomas Garnett may refer to:

 Thomas Garnet (or Garnett) (c. 1575–1608), English saint
 Thomas Garnett (physician) (1766–1802), English physician
 Thomas Garnett (manufacturer) (1799–1878), manufacturer and naturalist
 Thomas Garnett (footballer) (1900–1950), English association footballer
 Tommy Garnett (1915–2006), English and Australian headmaster, horticulturist, ornithologist, cricketer and author